This Must Be Love may refer to:
 This Must Be Love (album), an album by The 88
 "This Must Be Love" (song), a 2007 song by Little Man Tate
"This Must Be Love", a 1990 song by Loïs Lane
"This Must Be Love", a 1981 song by Phil Collins from the album Face Value

See also
It Must Be Love (disambiguation)